The krone (abbreviation: kr (also NKr for distinction); code: NOK), plural kroner, is currency of the Kingdom of Norway (including Svalbard). Traditionally known as the Norwegian crown in English. It is nominally subdivided into 100 øre, although the last coins denominated in øre were withdrawn in 2012.

The krone was the thirteenth-most-traded currency in the world by value in April 2010, down three positions from 2007.

The Norwegian krone is also informally accepted in many shops in Sweden and Finland that are close to the Norwegian border, and also in some shops in the Danish ferry ports of Hirtshals and Frederikshavn. Norwegians spent 14.1 billion NOK on border shopping in 2015 compared to 10.5 billion NOK spent in 2010. Border shopping is a fairly common practice amongst Norwegians, though it is seldom done on impulse. Money is spent mainly on food articles, alcohol, and tobacco, in that order, usually in bulk or large quantities. This is due to considerably higher taxes and fees on tobacco and alcohol purchased domestically in Norway.

History 

The krone was introduced in 1875, replacing the Norwegian speciedaler/spesidaler at a rate of 4 kroner = 1 speciedaler. In doing so, Norway joined the Scandinavian Monetary Union, which had been established in 1873. The Scandinavian currencies were mutually exchangeable at par until 1914 with the suspension of the gold standard due to World War I. After this date, the currencies of Denmark, Norway, and Sweden ceased to be mutually equivalent to each other.

Within the Scandinavian Monetary Union, the krone was on a gold standard of 2,480 kroner = 1 kilogram of pure gold (1 krone = 403.226 milligrams of gold). The gold standard was suspended from 1914 to 1916 and from 1920 to 1928, and in 1931 it was permanently suspended. In 1933 the krone was pegged to the pound sterling at 1 pound = 19.9 kroner, and in 1939 the krone was pegged to the U.S. dollar at $1 = 4.4 kroner.

During the German occupation (1940–1945) in the Second World War, the krone was initially pegged to the Reichsmark at a rate of 1 krone = 0.6 Reichsmark, later reduced to 0.57. After the war, a peg of 1 pound = 20 kroner was established in 1946, equivalent to US$1 = 4.963 kroner before the 1949 devaluation of sterling revised it to US$1 = 7.142 kroner.

In December 1992, the Central Bank of Norway abandoned the fixed exchange rate system in favor of floating exchange rates (managed float) due to the heavy speculation against the Norwegian currency in the early 1990s, which lost the central bank around two billion kroner in defensive purchases of the NOK through the usage of foreign currency reserves for a relatively short period of time.

Summary of denominations issued

Sources:

Coins
In 1875, coins were introduced (some dated 1874) in denominations of 10 and 50 øre and 1 and 10 kroner. These coins also bore the denomination in the previous currency, as 3, 15, and 30 skillings and  specidaler. Between 1875 and 1878, the new coinage was introduced in full, in denominations of 1, 2, 5, 10, 25, and 50 øre and 1, 2, and 10 kroner. The 1, 2, and 5 øre were struck in bronze; the 10, 25, and 50 øre and 1 and 2 kroner, in silver; and the 10 and 20 kroner, in gold.

The last gold coins were issued in 1910; silver was replaced by cupro-nickel in 1920. Between 1917 and 1921, iron temporarily replaced bronze. 1917 also saw the last issuance of 2 kroner coins. During the German occupation of Norway in the Second World War, zinc was used in place of cupro-nickel in 10, 25, and 50 øre coins and production of the 1 krone piece was suspended.

In 1963, 5 kroner coins were introduced. Production of 1 and 2 øre coins ceased in 1972. The following year, the size of the 5-øre coin was reduced; production of the denomination ceased in 1982, along with the minting of the 25 øre. Ten-kroner coins were introduced in 1983. In 1992, the last 10 øre coins were minted.

Between 1994 and 1998, a new coinage was introduced, consisting of 50 øre, 1, 5, 10, and 20 kroner. These are the only coins that are currently legal tender, with the exception of the 50 øre coin which was withdrawn on 1 May 2012. It was withdrawn because it was no longer circulating as an ordinary coin used for payment. However, banks in Norway will still exchange 50 øre coins for higher values until 2022.

The 10 and 20 kroner coins carry the effigy of the current monarch. Previously the 1 and 5 kroner coins also carried the royal effigy, but now these denominations are decorated only with stylistic royal or national symbols.

Coins and banknotes of the Norwegian krone are distributed by the Central Bank of Norway.

Up to 25 coins of any single denomination is considered —a legally recognized method of payment, in which the intended recipient can not refuse payment, according to Norwegian law.

Use of 10 Syrian pound coins in Norway

The characteristics of the ten Syrian pound (LS 10) coin have been found to so closely resemble the Norwegian 20 kroner (NKr 20) coin that it can fool vending machines, coins-to-cash machines, arcade machines, and any other coin-operated, automated service machine in the country. Machines are unable to tell the coins apart, owing to their almost identical weight and size.

As of mid-February 2017, LS 10 was worth NKr 0.39, making the 20-kroner coin 51.5 times more valuable than the 10-pound coin. While not easy to find in Norway, the Syrian coins are still used in automated machines there with such frequency that , the Norwegian postal service, decided to close many of their coins-to-cash machines on 18 February 2006, with plans to develop a system able to differentiate between the two coins. In the summer of 2005, a Norwegian man was sentenced to 30 day suspended sentence, for having used Syrian coins in arcade machines in the municipality of Bærum.

Banknotes

In 1877, Norges Bank introduced notes for 5, 10, 50, 100, 500, and 1000 kroner. In 1917, 1 krone notes were issued, and 2 kroner notes were issued between 1918 and 1922. Because of metal shortages, 1 and 2 kroner notes were again issued between 1940 and 1950. In 1963, 5 kroner notes were replaced by coins, with the same happening to the 10 kroner notes in 1984. Two hundred kroner notes were introduced in 1994.

Exchange rates 

The value of the Norwegian krone compared to other currencies varies considerably from one year to another, mainly based on changes in oil prices and interest rates. In 2002 the Norwegian krone grew to record high levels against the United States dollar and the euro. On 2 January 2002, 100 kroner were worth US$11.14 ($1 = 8.98 kroner). In July 2002, the krone hit a high at 100 kroner = $13.7 ($1 = 7.36 kroner). In addition to the high level of interest, which increased further on 4 July 2002, to 7 percent, the price of oil was high. At the time Norway was the world's third largest oil exporter.

In 2005, oil prices reached record levels of more than 60 dollars per barrel. Although interest rates had decreased to around 2 percent, the Norwegian krone grew even stronger.

However, in late 2007 and early 2008, the dollar suffered a steady depreciation against all other major currencies. The Norwegian krone was gaining value at the same time; as a result, the krone became stronger than ever compared to the dollar, making the dollar worth about 5 kroner in April 2008. By October 2008, the dollar had recovered and was worth approximately 7 kroner. Following 2009, the krone once again saw strong growth, making the dollar worth about 5.8 kroner as of the beginning of 2010. Since then, the dollar has gone up further and as of October 2019 was worth about 9 kroner. During the COVID-19 pandemic, the krone fell heavily, making one dollar cost 12.00 kroner on 19 March 2020.

See also 
 Danish krone
 Economy of Norway
 Estonian kroon
 Gold reserves of Norway
 Icelandic króna
 Scandinavian Monetary Union
 Swedish krona
 Table of historical exchange rates

Notes

References

External links
 Factors that influence the krone exchange rate, information from Norges Bank in 2000.
 The banknotes of Norway 
 Official exchange rates in Norway 

 
 Currencies introduced in 1875
Krone, Norwegian